Albert Webster (1920-2014) was an Australian professional rugby league footballer who played in the 1930s and 1940s. He played for South Sydney in the New South Wales Rugby League (NSWRL) competition.

Playing career
Webster made his first grade debut against Newtown in Round 10 1939 at Earl Park, Arncliffe. That season, Souths finished in 4th position and reached the grand final after defeating St George in the preliminary final.

Souths opponents in the grand final were minor premiers Balmain. Webster played at halfback as Souths were held tryless and suffered a heavy 33-4 defeat at the Sydney Cricket Ground. In the following seasons, Webster mainly played reserve grade for the club and in his final season he played 8 games as Souths finished last claiming the wooden spoon in 1946. Webster retired from playing following the conclusion of this season. In total, Webster played 42 games for the club across all grades.

References

Australian rugby league players
South Sydney Rabbitohs players
Rugby league halfbacks
1920 births
2014 deaths
Rugby league players from Sydney